(English: biografiA: Biographical Database and Encyclopedia of Austrian Women) is a biographical dictionary of historical and contemporary notable women of Austria. The German language open-access full text is available online. 

The encyclopedia, edited by Ilse Korotin and published in 2016 by Böhlau Verlag in 4,280 pages over four printed volumes, contains around 6,500 biographies from Roman times to the present day. biografiA draws on unpublished earlier work by Erika Weinzierl and Ruth Aspöck.

References

External links
 FWF-E-Book Library (online reading, search and downloadable sections)
 Download full-text PDF
 oapen.org: Volume 1, Volume 2, Volume 3, Volume 4

Austrian women
Austrian biographical dictionaries
Biographical dictionaries of women
2016 books
Open access publications